Hangard Airlines was a Mongolian airline based in the capital, Ulaanbaatar. It operated charter flights inside Mongolia from its main base at Buyant-Ukhaa International Airport (ULN). It was privately owned, and ceased all operations in 2001.

History 

The airline was established in 1992 by Hangard Travel Agency and started operations on 1 January 1993 using the Antonov 24.  The airline ceased all operations in 2001.

Destinations 

Hangard operated the following services (at February 2000):

Mongolia
Altai (Altai Airport)
Arvaikheer (Arvaikheer Airport)
Baruun-Urt (Baruun-Urt Airport)
Dalanzadgad (Dalanzadgad Airport)
Khovd (Khovd Airport)
Bulgan, Khovd (Bulgan Airport, Khovd)
Mörön (Mörön Airport)
Tosontzengel, Zavkhan (Tosontsengel Airport)
Ölgii (Ölgii Airport)
Ulaanbaatar - Buyant-Ukhaa International Airport
Ulaangom (Ulaangom Airport)
Uliastai (Uliastai Airport)

Fleet 

The Hangard fleet consisted of a single Antonov 24B aircraft (MT-7048). The aircraft paint scheme suggests the aircraft is either an ex-Aeroflot or ex-MIAT Mongolian Airlines aircraft.

External links 
Hangard Airlines

Defunct airlines of Mongolia
Airlines established in 1992
Airlines disestablished in 2001
Companies based in Ulaanbaatar